Stodmarsh is a small village 5 miles to the east of Canterbury in east Kent, England, overlooking the valley of the River Stour.

Stodmarsh is now part of the parish of Wickhambreaux. The parish had a 2001 population of 479.

The name Stodmarsh is derived from the Saxon words "stode", meaning mare, and "merse", a marsh, demonstrating its former use of pasture for cattle among the marshes.

History 
Stodmarsh has been occupied since at least Saxon times, and Saxon burial tumuli have been found near Stodmarsh Court, the 17th century former manor house.

In 686 king Eadric of Kent gave the manor, consisting of three ploughlands in the marsh called "Stodmersh", to the monastery of St Augustine in Canterbury. In 1270 Henry III extended this by granting free-warren in all their demesne lands of "Stodmarsch" to the abbot.

When the monastery was dissolved in 1537 by Henry VIII the manor fell into the hands of the king, before being granted to John Master of East Langdon six years later who moved to Stodmarsh Court.

Stodmarsh was originally a separate civil parish but was added to Wickhambreaux parish in 1934. It falls into the deanery of Bridge within the diocese of Canterbury.

Church 
The church, dedicated to St Mary is small and consists of a single aisle and chancel. It has a low pointed turret at the western end containing two bells.

This church was originally part of the possessions of the abbey at Canterbury, and remained so until 1243, when the abbot Robert, at the insistence of archdeacon Simon de Langton, granted it to the hospital of poor priests in Canterbury, together with four acres of Stodmarsh, on the condition that they should not demand in future any tithes from the abbey. When the hospital was dissolved in 1575 Elizabeth I gave all its possessions to the city of Canterbury. Stodmarsh church seems not to have been passed to the city but instead fell to the archdeaconry of Canterbury where it still remains.

The church was first built in the 12th and 13th centuries and modernised around 1880. The porch contains notable carvings known as "Crusaders' Crosses". The X-shaped brace that supports the bell turret is believed to be unique in Kent.

Village life
The village has one public house, the Red Lion. Originally built in the fifteenth century, it was rebuilt in 1801 after a fire.

Nature Reserve
The Stodmarsh National Nature Reserve lies immediately to the north and the Stour Valley Walk passes through the village. Covering an area of 241 hectares of wetlands, the reserve is known for the diversity of birds that have been sighted there, with over 200 species recorded.

References

External links
 Stodmarsh Parish Church

Villages in Kent